Lepidopsetta is a genus of righteye flounders native to the North Pacific Ocean.

Species
There are currently three recognized species in this genus:
 Lepidopsetta bilineata (Ayres, 1855) (Rock sole)
 Lepidopsetta mochigarei Snyder, 1911 (Dusky sole)
 Lepidopsetta polyxystra J. W. Orr & Matarese, 2000 (Northern rock sole)

References

 
Pleuronectidae
Fish of the Pacific Ocean
Marine fish genera
Taxa named by Theodore Gill